Keeriparai is a hillock area in Kanniyakumari district of Tamil Nadu state in the peninsular India. Boothapandi, Vadasery, Nagercoil and Kulasekaram are some of the important neighbourhoods of Keeriparai. (Government-run) Arasu Rubber Corporation has a rubber factory in Keeriparai.

Keeriparai area falls under the Nagercoil Assembly constituency. The winner of the election held in the year 2021 as the member of its assembly constituency is M. R. Gandhi. Also, this area belongs to Kanniyakumari Lok Sabha constituency. Vijay Vasanth won the 2019 elections, as the member of its Lok Sabha constituency.

References

External links 
  
 

Cities and towns in Kanyakumari district